Douglas James Ladret (born November 13, 1961) is a Canadian figure skating coach and former competitive pair skater. With Christine Hough, he is the 1987 Skate Canada International champion, 1989 NHK Trophy bronze medallist, and 1988 Canadian national champion. They competed twice at the Winter Olympics, in 1988 and 1992.

Personal life 
Ladret was born on November 13, 1961, in Vancouver, British Columbia, Canada. He is the fifth child of Alfred Arnold Ladret, a fisherman and logger, and Ellen Hannah Ladret, a baker and housemaker. He grew up between the fishing town of Powell River and the logging camp at Boswell in Smith Inlet, British Columbia. He developed a deep interest in music spurred on by his oldest brother's band (Alfred Spencer a.k.a. Snuffy) rehearsing in the basement of their house.

Ladret married Canadian figure skater Lara Carscadden. Their son, Nigel Hayden, was born on November 30, 2005.

Career 
Ladret took to the ice after one of his brothers, Greg, started figure skating in 1965. He began his partnership with Christine Hough by 1984. The pair took silver at the St. Ivel International in 1985 and gold the following year. In the 1987–88 season, they won gold at the 1987 Skate Canada International and the 1988 Canadian Championships. They were selected to compete at the 1988 Winter Olympics and placed 8th in Calgary.

Hough/Ladret received the bronze medal at the 1989 NHK Trophy, silver at the 1990 Nations Cup, and gold at the 1990 Skate Electric. Following their third consecutive national silver medal, they were sent to the 1992 Winter Olympics in Albertville, France, where they finished 9th. Concluding their ISU-eligible career, the two placed 9th at the 1992 World Championships.

Hough/Ladret performed with Stars on Ice from 1992 to 1997. They also appeared as skaters in the movie The Cutting Edge.

Ladret coaches in Scottsdale, Arizona with his wife, Lara. They have produced numerous international skaters including Douglas Razzano. Ladret has served as the Director of Figure Skating at the Ice Den in Scottsdale, Arizona. He has also worked as a power skating specialist for ice hockey teams in the Phoenix area. He is also a coach at the Monument Skating Academy in Colorado.

Results
(with Christine Hough)

References

1961 births
Canadian male pair skaters
Canadian figure skating coaches
Olympic figure skaters of Canada
Figure skaters at the 1988 Winter Olympics
Figure skaters at the 1992 Winter Olympics
Living people
Figure skaters from Vancouver
Canadian emigrants to the United States